Joseph John Kruzel (February 17, 1918 – July 10, 2002) was a United States Air Force major general and a flying ace during World War II.

Early life
Kruzel was born on 1918 in Wilkes-Barre, Pennsylvania. He attended Scranton University, where he graduated with a bachelor's degree in chemistry in 1938 and bachelor's degree in education in 1939.

Military career
On May 13, 1940, he joined the Aviation Cadet Program of the U.S. Army Air Corps and was commissioned a second lieutenant and awarded his pilot wings at Kelly Field in Texas, on December 20, 1940.

World War II
After receiving his pilot wings, Kruzel was assigned to 2d Observation Squadron at Clark Field in the Philippine Islands and later was transferred to 17th Pursuit Squadron at Nichols Field in Manila in September 1941, where they were equipped with P-40 Warhawks. Following the Japanese attack on Pearl Harbor and subsequent Japanese invasion of the Philippines in December 1941, Kruzel and much of the 17th PS evacuated to Australia and took part in the Dutch East Indies campaign.

On February 17, 1942, flying P-40s, Kruzel scored his first aerial victory when he shot down a Nakajima Ki-27 over Palembang. From February 19 to February 20, 1942, he shot down two A6M Zeroes. In March 1942, he joined the 9th Fighter Squadron in Australia and flew combat missions until returning to the U.S. in December 1942. He was promoted to captain on April 1, 1942, and logged over 175 combat hours.

After his return to the United States, he was promoted to major on July 23, 1943, and assigned as commander of the 323d Fighter Squadron at Richmond Army Air Base in Virginia. Kruzel became Executive Officer of the 361st Fighter Group in March 1943. In November 1943, the group was deployed to England, where it was stationed at RAF Bottisham and received the P-47 Thunderbolts. The 361st FG began flying combat missions on January 21, 1944, and on February 22, Kruzel scored his first aerial victory over Europe and his fourth overall, when he shot down a Focke-Wulf Fw 190. He scored a shared aerial victory on April 29 and in May 1944, the 361st FG converted to P-51 Mustangs.

Kruzel became a flying ace on June 13, when he shot down a Messerschmitt Bf 109, his fifth aerial victory. He shot down a Fw 190 on June 25, his sixth and final aerial victory.

During World War II, Kruzel was credited with the destruction of 6.5 enemy aircraft with 1 damaged in the air and 1 shared destruction. While serving with the 361st FG, he flew P-51s bearing the name "Vi".

After his return to the U.S. in January 1945, he was assigned as an instructor trainee at Hillsgrove Army Air Base in Rhode Island, from January to March 1945 and as Deputy Commander of Seymour Johnson Field in North Carolina, which was a P-47 Combat Crew Training School and later a separation center, from March 1945 to January 1946.

Post war
In January 1946, Kruzel attended the senior officer's Asiatic Study Course at Yale University.

He was assigned to the Air Office of the XXIV Corps, in Seoul, Korea, in April 1946. He served with Headquarters Far East Air Forces in Tokyo, Japan, from May 1947 to September 1947, followed by a tour of duty as commander of the reactivated 18th Fighter Group, which was equipped with P-47 and subsequently P-51 aircraft at Clark Field in the Philippine Islands.

In 1949, Kruzel attended the Air Command and Staff College at Maxwell Air Force Base in Alabama and upon graduation was assigned to the War Plans Division at the Headquarters U.S. Air Force. He later attended the Air War College at Maxwell Air Force Base, graduating in June 1954. He was retained at the Air War College as a member of the Evaluation Staff through May 1957.

In June 1957, he was assigned as chief, War Plans Division, Headquarters U.S. Air Forces in Europe, at Wiesbaden, West Germany; and in January 1958 as chief, command post, Supreme Headquarters Allied Powers in Europe, in Paris, France.

He returned to the United States in July 1960 and attended the National War College. He next was assigned as vice commander of the 354th Tactical Fighter Wing, equipped with North American F-100 Super Sabres, at Myrtle Beach Air Force Base in South Carolina, and he became commander of the wing in April 1963. He assumed command of the 832nd Air Division at Cannon Air Force Base, in New Mexico, in January 1964.

In August 1965, Kruzel was assigned to Headquarters Pacific Air Forces at Hickam Air Force Base in Hawaii, as director of operations and in August 1966 became deputy chief of staff for operations. In August 1968 he was assigned as vice commander of Fifth Air Force with headquarters at Fuchu Air Station in Japan.

He returned to the United States and was assigned in August 1969 to Headquarters U.S. Air Force in the Pentagon as deputy director of operations, Deputy Chief of Staff, Plans and Operations until his retirement from the Air Force on August 1, 1970.

Personal life
Kruzel married Violet Mable, née Clark (1923-1979) on 1945. They had four children and numerous grandchildren. On 1984, Kruzel remarried to Betty Sue, née Tucker.

Kruzel's son Joseph graduated from the U.S. Air Force Academy in 1967 and served as an intelligence officer and as a briefing officer for the Joint Chiefs of Staff during the Vietnam War. He later joined the U.S. Department of State and served as a member of the U.S. delegation to the Strategic Arms Limitation Talks in Helsinki. He was appointed special assistant to U.S. Secretary of Defense Harold Brown and later legislative assistant for defense and foreign policy for Senator Edward Kennedy. Kruzel left government service to teach at Duke and Ohio State Universities. In 1993, Kruzel served as deputy assistant secretary of defense for European and NATO policy. He was one of the creators of Partnership for Peace program, which aimed at creating trust between the member states of NATO and other states in Europe, including post-Soviet states. On 1993, he was appointed as Department of Defense's special envoy to Bosnia and chief negotiator on the United States team working to end the Yugoslav Wars. On August 19, 1995, while en route to Sarajevo for scheduled meeting with President of Bosnia Alija Izetbegovic, Kruzel and two other American diplomats, Robert C. Frasure and Samuel Nelson Drew, were killed when their armored personnel carrier crashed into a 500-meter slope into a ravine when a rain-soaked dirt road at Mount Igman they were travelling on collapsed. He was posthumously awarded the Presidential Citizens Medal on December 15, 1995, by U.S. President Bill Clinton.

Later life
Kruzel died on July 10, 2002, at the age of 84. After memorial services held for him at West Chapel in Eglin Air Force Base, he was buried with full military honors alongside his first wife and son at Arlington National Cemetery.

Aerial victory credits

SOURCES: Air Force Historical Study 85: USAF Credits for the Destruction of Enemy Aircraft, World War II

Awards and deocrations
His military decorations include the Silver Star with two oak leaf clusters, Legion of Merit, Distinguished Flying Cross with oak leaf cluster, Air Medal with three oak leaf clusters, and the Bronze Star Medal.

References

1918 births
2002 deaths
People from Wilkes-Barre, Pennsylvania
Military personnel from Pennsylvania
Aviators from Pennsylvania
Recipients of the Air Force Distinguished Service Medal
Recipients of the Silver Star
Recipients of the Legion of Merit
Recipients of the Distinguished Flying Cross (United States)
Recipients of the Air Medal
United States Army Air Forces officers
United States Army Air Forces pilots of World War II
American World War II flying aces
United States Air Force generals
University of Scranton alumni
Yale University alumni
Air War College alumni
National War College alumni
Burials at Arlington National Cemetery